John Newcombe and Tony Roche were the defending champions but both players chose not to participate.

Ilie Năstase and Ion Ţiriac won in the final 6–2, 6–4, 6–3 against Arthur Ashe and Charlie Pasarell.

Seeds

Draw

Finals

Top half

Section 1

Section 2

Section 3

Section 4

Bottom half

Section 5

Section 6

Section 7

Section 8

References

External links
1970 French Open – Men's draws and results at the International Tennis Federation

Men's Doubles
French Open by year – Men's doubles